Hermann Ahlwardt  (21 December 1846 – 16 April 1914) was a writer, a member of the Reichstag (German parliament) and a vehement antisemite.

Life
After stealing money collected for the children's Christmas party in 1889, Ahlwardt was fired from his job as a primary school principal. He blamed his financial difficulties on Jewish money-lenders and wrote a book claiming the German government was in the pay of the Jewish banker, Gerson von Bleichröder. He was jailed for four months when it came to light that the documents he used to support the claim had been written by Ahlwardt himself. 

In 1892, Ahlwardt accused arms manufacturer Ludwig Loewe & Co. of being in a Jewish-French conspiracy to sell defective rifles to the German army in order to weaken the country militarily and was sentenced to five months' imprisonment for this unfounded defamation but was not jailed because by this time he had been elected to the Reichstag. He had run in a by-election for a very rural Brandenberg district seat. World agriculture prices were depressed at the time and he had told this farming community that their troubles were due to the Jews.

In the Reichstag he described Jews as "predators" and "cholera bacilli" that should be exterminated. The popularity of Ahlwardt and another antisemite Reichstag deputy, Otto Böckel, in conservative rural electorates prompted the German Conservative Party to add an antisemitic plank to their 1892 Tivoli Congress platform. 

Ahlwardt's violent rhetoric alienated even other antisemitic politicians. In 1895, Ahlwardt was expelled from the German Social Reform Party and, with Otto Böckel, founded the Antisemitic People's Party (Antisemitische Volkspartei). He lost his seat in the 1903 Reichstag election and withdrew from politics. He visited the United States and on returning to Germany began campaigning against Freemasonry. He was imprisoned again in 1909, this time for blackmail, and in 1914 Ahlwardt died in a traffic accident in Leipzig at the age of 67.

During his visit to the United States, he went to New York and made a speech against Jews. A popular story told by The New York Times in 1940 has it that when he asked for police protection, the police that were assigned to guard him were all Jews. This is argued as false mostly by anti-semites following stereotypes around who is and isn't Jewish, supposedly supported by news articles of the time that show the names of officers printed during his 1895 visit are not generally used by Jews, such as Cartright and O'Brien.  However, Theodore Roosevelt, who was the Police Commissioner at the time, confirms in his autobiography that he deliberately assigned Jewish police to protect Ahlwardt, in order to ridicule him. In addition, there have been multiple Jewish families with the last name "O'Brien" and "Cartright"

Selected works
The desperate struggle of the Aryan peoples with Judaism, 3 vols., 1890
Part 2: The oath of a Jew
Part 3: Jewish tactics, at the same time answer to Mr. Ludwig Jacobowski
The processes Manché and Bleichröder, 1892
The Jews and the Germans. A supplement to the Jews, 1892
The Great Prophet. A reminder and parting word to my anti-Semitic friends, 1892
The Jewish question. Lecture, 1892
Ottering, 1892
My arrest, 1892
As the Jew does, Lecture, 1892
The Treaty of Germany, 1913
Truths about a German mine in Bohemia. Rudolfstädter Erzbergbau-Gewerkschaft in České Budějovice. A reality novel of a modern kind with the usual accompaniments of suicide, madness and despair, 1913
More light! The assassination of Friedrich Schiller, Lessing and Mozart before the Forum of Modern Literary and World History, 1914
More light! The Order of Jesus in His True Form and in His Relations with Freemasonry and Judaism, 1919

References

1846 births
1914 deaths
People from Vorpommern-Greifswald
People from the Province of Pomerania
German Protestants
German Reform Party politicians
Members of the 8th Reichstag of the German Empire
Members of the 9th Reichstag of the German Empire
Members of the 10th Reichstag of the German Empire
German male journalists
German journalists
German male writers